Víctor Peralta may refer to:

 Víctor Peralta (boxer) (1908–1995), Argentine boxer
 Víctor Peralta (athlete) (born 1942), retired long-distance runner from Mexico